Kentucky Route 1590 (KY 1590) is a secondary state highway located entirely in Clinton County in south-central Kentucky.

Route description 
KY 1590 begins at a junction with US 127 in Albany. The route meets US 127 and US 127 Business, and then it goes northwestward to cross KY 90 and returns to US 127 to terminate at that intersection near Ida.

History 
Until sometime in the 1960s, the first  of the route was an original alignment of Kentucky Route 90S, a suffixed, or split branch route of KY 90. KY 90-S ran from the main KY 90 corridor southeast to Albany, then it ran concurrently on KY 35 (what is now US 127) back to KY 90 near the community of Snow. Portions of the concurrency near the current US 127/KY 90 junction is also designated as KY 2063.

From KY 90 to Ida, KY 1590 was an original alignment of KY 90. KY 1590 was officially designated onto the former KY 90S when it was decommissioned at a time around 1969-1970.
When KY 90 was rerouted onto its current alignment in Clinton County in the mid 1970s, KY 1590 was also extended onto its original alignment north of KY 90 and west of US 127 to Ida.

Major intersections

References

External links
Kentucky Transportation Cabinet

Kentucky Route 90
U.S. Route 127
1590
1590